Agrypninae is a subfamily of click beetles in the family Elateridae. There are at least 130 genera and more than 430 described species in Agrypninae.

Genera
These genera are members of the subfamily Agrypninae:

 Acrocryptus Candèze, 1874
 Adelocera Latreille, 1829
 Aeoloderma Fleutiaux, 1928
 Aeoloides Schwarz, 1906
 Aeolosomus Dolin, 1982
 Aeolus Eschscholtz, 1829
 Agnostelater Costa, 1975
 Agraeus Candèze, 1857
 Agrypnus Eschscholtz, 1829
 Alampoides Schwarz, 1906
 Alaolacon Candèze, 1865
 Alaomorphus Hauser, 1900
 Alaus Eschscholtz, 1829
 Aliteus Candèze, 1857
 Anaissus Candèze, 1857
 Anathesis Candèze, 1865
 Anthracalaus Fairmaire, 1889
 Antitypus Candèze, 1882
 Aphileus Candèze, 1857
 Apochresis Candèze, 1882
 Arcanelater Costa, 1975
 Austrocalais Neboiss, 1967
 Babadrasterius Ôhira, 1994
 Calais Laporte, 1838
 Candanius Hayek, 1973
 Carlota Arias-Bohart, 2014
 Catelanus Fleutiaux, 1942
 Chalcolepidinus Pjatakowa, 1941
 Chalcolepidius Eschscholtz, 1829
 Chalcolepis Candèze, 1857
 Christinea Gurjeva, 1987
 Chrostus Candèze, 1878
 Cleidecosta Johnson, 2002
 Coctilelater Costa, 1975
 Collisarius Schimmel & Tarnawski, 2012
 Compresselater Platia & Gudenzi, 2006
 Compsolacon Reitter, 1905
 Compsoplinthus Costa, 1975
 Conobajulus Van Zwaluwenburg, 1940
 Coryleus Fleutiaux, 1942
 Cryptalaus Ôhira, 1967
 Cryptolampros Costa, 1975
 Cuneateus Schimmel & Tarnawski, 2012
 Danosoma C.G.Thompson, 1859
 Deilelater Costa, 1975  (glowing click beetles)
 Deronocus Johnson, 1997
 Dilobitarsus Latreille, 1834
 Dorygonus Candèze, 1859
 Drasterius Eschscholtz, 1829
 Drilus Olivier, 1790
 Eidolus Candèze, 1857
 Elasmosomus Schwarz, 1902
 Euphemus Laporte, 1838
 Euplinthus Costa, 1975
 Flabelloselasia Kundrata & Bocak, 2017
 Fulgeochlizus Costa, 1975
 Fusimorphus Fleutiaux, 1942
 Gahanus Platia, 2012
 Grammephorus Solier, 1851
 Hapsodrilus Costa, 1975
 Hartenius Platia, 2007
 Hemicleus Candèze, 1857
 Hemirhipus Berthold, 1827
 Heteroderes Latreille, 1834
 Hifo Candèze, 1882
 Hifoides Schwarz, 1906
 Hypsiophthalmus Latreille, 1834
 Ignelater Costa, 1975
 Kupeselasia Kundrata & Bocak, 2017
 Lacon Laporte, 1838
 Lanelater Arnett, 1952
 Lobotarsus Schwarz, 1898
 Lolosia Kundrata & Bocak, 2017
 Ludioctenus Fairmaire, 1893
 Lycoreus Candèze, 1857
 Lygelater Costa, 1975
 Macromalocera Hope, 1834
 Malacogaster Bassi, 1834
 Melanthoides Candèze, 1865
 Meristhus Candèze, 1857
 Meroplinthus Candèze, 1891
 Metapyrophorus Rosa & Costa, 2009
 Microselasia Kundrata & Bocak, 2017
 Mocquerysia Fleutiaux, 1899
 Monocrepidius Eschscholtz, 1829
 Nanseia Kishii, 1985
 Neocalais Girard, 1971
 Neodrasterius Kishii, 1996
 Nipponodrasterius Kishii, 1966
 Noxlumenes Costa, 1975
 Nycterilampus Montrouzier, 1860
 Nyctophyxis Costa, 1975
 Octocryptus Candèze, 1892
 Opselater Costa, 1975
 Optaleus Candèze, 1857
 Pachyderes Guérin-Méneville, 1829
 Paraheteroderes Girard, 2017
 Paraphileus Candèze, 1882
 Peralampes Johnson, 2002
 Phanophorus Solier, 1851
 Phedomenus Candèze, 1889
 Pherhimius Fleutiaux, 1942
 Phertetrigus Schimmel & Tarnawski, 2012
 Phibisa Fleutiaux, 1942
 Photophorus Candèze, 1863
 Platianellus Schimmel & Tarnawski, 2012
 Platycrepidius Candèze, 1859
 Propalaus Casari, 2008
 Pseudaeolus Candèze, 1891
 Pseudocalais Girard, 1971
 Ptesimopsia Costa, 1975
 Punctodensus Patwardhan, Schimmel & Athalye, 2009
 Pyrearinus Costa, 1975
 Pyrischius Hyslop, 1921
 Pyrophorus Billberg, 1820
 Pyroptesis Costa, 1975
 Rismethus Fleutiaux, 1947
 Saltamartinus Casari, 1996
 Saudilacon Chassain, 1983
 Scaphoderus Candèze, 1857
 Selasia Laporte, 1838
 Sooporanga Costa, 1975
 Stangellus Golbach, 1975
 Sulcilacon Fleutiaux, 1927
 Telesus Candèze, 1880
 Tetrigus Candèze, 1857
 Thoramus Sharp, 1877
 Trieres Candèze, 1900
 Vesperelater Costa, 1975
 Wittmerselasia Kundrata & Bocak, 2017

References

Further reading

 
 

Elateridae